Manex Goihenetxe Etxamendi or Manex Goienetxe (22 September 1942 in Ezterenzubi, Lower Navarre – 2 March 2004 in Biscau mountain, Bearn) was a Basque historian, and cultural activist.

Biography 
Born to a farmer family, he went to Great Britain to study. After completing French High School in Roazhon in 1963, he was ordained friar in the congregation of Ploermael in 1967. In 1969, he graduated in history at Toulouse, and started working as a teacher. Goihenetxe also got the teacher certification (DEA) at Pau in 1981. He earned his PhD in 1984. As a teacher, he got job positions in Oloron, Lourdes, Donibane Lohizune and Kastellin (Brittany).

He was the writer of the association "Ikas" from 1972 to 1983. He assumed the chief managerial position of the UEU from 1977 to 1979. On 27 July 1975, he was named associate member by Euskaltzaindia and made partner of Eusko Ikaskuntza. He was Basque school network Seaska's first worker on a payroll as an instructor (1977-1981), as well as holding other responsibilities in Kanbo, Baiona, and Ziburu (1981-2003). He was also a professor at the University of Pau and Baiona (Bayonne).

He could speak seven languages, i.e. Basque, French, Latin, English, Spanish, Gascon Occitan, and Aragonese. Thanks to his command of these languages, he carried out comprehensive research on the Basque Country.

He showed a special commitment for Basque culture and abertzale politics. He got first involved in politics during the Process of Burgos (1970). He was a founder of the political parties Embata and EHAS.

Manex was registered in the census of Anglet (Labourd) for many years and was also the Basque nationalist candidate of South Anglet in 1999. He devoted one of his books to this town of Labourd.

On 2 May 2004, he suffered a fatal accident at Biscau,a mountain in Bearn, where he died along with his partner Anne-Marie Pargade. His ashes were spread in Errozate, near his natal village Ezterenzubi.

Works 
He wrote many stories about the Basque Country in French as well as Basque. In this area he is one of the most important writers; the Histoire générale du Pays Basque serie is a really important reference. He was the first one writing about it from the Basque Country's point of view.
 Histoire de la Colonisation Française au Pays basque.
 Livre Blanc de la langue et culture basques. (1974)
 Les origines du problème basque. (1975)
 Pays Basque Nord: un peuple colonisé. (1979)
 L´oppression culturelle française au Pays Basque. (1981)
 Uztaritze au milieu du XIIe siecle. (1981)
 Les origines sociales et historiques d'Eskualzaleen Biltzarra (1893-1913). (1984)
 For et coutumes de Basse-Navarre. (1985)
 Bayonne: Guide Historique. (1986)
 Lapurdi Historian (Elkar, 1987, Donostia). Liburuen artean euskaraz dagoen bakarra.
 Les Basques et leur histoire. Mythes et réalités. (1993)
 Histoire d’Anglet. (1997)
 Histoire générale du Pays Basque I. (1998)
 Histoire générale du Pays Basque II. (1999)
 Histoire générale du Pays Basque III. (2001)
 Histoire générale du Pays Basque IV. (2002)

On the other hand, he wrote a long review and a part of a research project (20 more or less) important parts. In the Basque scientific community Inguma (data base)|Inguma data base, are 36 words written by him.

References

Sources 
 Jean-Louis Davant: Manex Goihenetxe 1942-2006, 'Bidegileak collection, Eusko Jaurlaritza, Gasteiz, 2006. Interneten hemen.
 Manex Goihenetxeren oroitzapenetan'' artikulua, Pruden Gartzia, "Uztaro" magazine 72. UEU, 2010. Bibliografia zehaztua dakar. Interneten irakurgai.

1942 births
2004 deaths